Summer Impressions of Planet Z is a 1986 Soviet two-part science-fiction film directed by Evgeniy Markovsky. Yuri Tomin wrote the script loosely based on his 1979 book Carousel Over the City ("Incident in Kuleminsk").

Plot
Felix, a 12-year-old boy from outer space, during the summer holidays gets admitted into a summer children's sports camp. Few people know in the camp that Felix is not there by chance, and a few days ago he was created in a school laboratory because a space intellect sent him as an agent to planet earth to study humans. He is assisted by an ordinary boy Boris and a teacher who explains Felix local traditions and customs.

Cast
Arnas Katinas – Felix Schastlivtsev, an alien
Giedrius Puskunigis – Borya Kulikov
Sergey Shakurov – Aleksey Pavlovich Mukhin, teacher of physics
Vadim Gems – Eduard Mikhailovich, hairdresser—detective
Galina Makarova – Marivanna, cleaner
Dmitry Matveyev – Vasyushkin
Dmitry Kharatyan – Andrei Morkovkin, soloist of the group "Astronauts", author and director of the rock opera "14 floors of solitude"
Irina Efremova – Lilja Librarian
Irina Zhangarova – doctor
Dmitry Iosifov – drummer of the group "Astronauts"
Dmitry Taradaikin
Konstantin Remishevsky
Igor Taradaikin – Kapustin
Sergey Biryukov – Serega Kulikov, brother of Boris
Rostislav Shmyrev – seller
Zhenya Tumilovich – baby Felix
Kolya Markovsky – young Felix

References

External links

Soviet science fiction films
1980s science fiction films
Belarusfilm films
Russian children's films
Soviet children's films